"Out of Control" is a single by the Japanese rock band Nothing's Carved in Stone released on March 6, 2013. The music was used as the second opening theme for the anime series Psycho-Pass.

Track listing

References 

2013 singles
Anime songs